Cho Yeon-woo (born Cho Jong-wook on May 30, 1971) is a South Korean actor. Cho made his acting debut in 2003, and his notable television dramas include Dear Heaven (2005), The Invisible Man (2006), What's Up Fox (2006), Moon Hee (2007), The Scarlet Letter (2010), and Can Love Become Money? (2012).

Filmography

Television series

Film

Variety show

Awards and nominations

References

External links 
  
 Cho Yeon-woo Fan Cafe at Daum 
 Cho Yeon-woo at JIStory Entertainment 
 
 
 

1971 births
Living people
South Korean male television actors
South Korean male film actors